The position of Marshal Foch Professor of French Literature at the University of Oxford was founded in 1918 shortly after the end of the First World War. Ferdinand Foch, or "Marshal Foch", was supreme commander of Allied forces from April 1918 onwards. The chair was endowed by an arms trader, Basil Zaharoff, in Foch's honour; he also endowed a post in English Literature at the University of Paris in honour of the British Field Marshal Earl Haig. Zaharoff wanted the University of Paris to have a right of veto over the appointment, but Oxford would not accept this. The compromise reached was that Paris should have a representative on the appointing committee (although this provision was later removed). In advance of the first election, Stéphen Pichon (the French Foreign Minister) unsuccessfully attempted to influence the decision.  The first professor, Gustave Rudler, was appointed in 1920. , the chair is held by Catriona Seth.  The position is held in conjunction with a Fellowship of All Souls College.

History
The position of Marshal Foch Professor of French Literature in the Faculty of Medieval and Modern Languages at the University of Oxford was founded in 1918 shortly after the end of the First World War. It honours the French general Ferdinand Foch, known as "Marshal Foch", who from April 1918 was supreme commander of the Allied forces. Basil Zaharoff, a Greek-born French arms trader and financier, gave £25,000 ( in ) to the university to establish the chair and to support French studies in other ways, such as the award of scholarships to students for travel, e.g. the Zaharoff Travelling Scholarship. Oxford marked Zaharoff's generosity by conferring upon him an Honorary Doctorate of Civil Law (DCL) in October 1920.

News of the donation was announced in The Times on 21 November 1918, shortly after Foch was one of the signatories of the Armistice with Germany on 11 November that ended hostilities. The Times said that the name of the professorship was "most felicitously chosen", commemorating the "recent great events" and preparing for the "intellectual entente of the coming years." It also noted that French language and literature, for the first time, would be "enthroned in Oxford side by side with Greek and with Latin" – professorships in both subjects having existed at Oxford for many years before Zaharoff's donation. Zaharoff also founded the Earl Haig Chair of English Literature at the University of Paris, in honour of Douglas Haig, 1st Earl Haig, Field Marshal and commander of the British forces on the Western Front from 1915 until the end of the Great War. The necessary changes to the university's statutes were made at a meeting of Congregation (Oxford's governing body) on 18 February 1919.  During the debate, Sir Herbert Warren, the president of Magdalen College, Oxford, stated that the Professor was to be paid £500 annually, "making it a first-rate chair."

Zaharoff initially stipulated that Oxford's choice of Marshal Foch Professor should be approved by the University of Paris. This provision was unacceptable to Oxford University's authorities, who regarded it as ceding control over the appointment.  As a compromise, it was agreed that Paris should be represented on the committee selecting the professor. According to the historian Elizabeth Greenslade, "the French regarded the appointment to the new chair as an opportunity to improve Franco-British inter-university relations." Stéphen Pichon (the French Minister of Foreign Affairs) had a preferred candidate in mind. He asked the French Ambassador in London to reach an agreement with Gustave Lanson, the representative of the University of Paris, that Lanson would support Pichon's choice during the selection process. No agreement was reached.  In the end, neither Pichon's choice, nor the candidate supported by both Lanson and Zaharoff, were appointed, as Oxford wanted candidates with British teaching experience.  The first professor, Gustave Rudler (formerly of the University of London), took up the position in 1920; he was one of eight French applicants for the post, and also defeated five British candidates. The anonymous London correspondent of The Manchester Guardian wrote in 1919 that London University "sustains an immense loss" through Rudler's appointment and "can ill afford to lose him", since he had "raised the study of French literature to an entirely new plane".

The post is associated with a non-stipendiary Fellowship of All Souls College. Changes to the university's internal rules since 1920 have abolished specific statutes for the duties of, and rules for appointment to, individual chairs such as the Marshal Foch Professorship. The University Council is now empowered to make appropriate arrangements for appointments and conditions of service, and the college to which any professorship is allocated (All Souls in this instance) has two representatives on the board of electors.

Professors

See also
List of professorships at the University of Oxford

Notes and references
Notes

References

French Literature, Foch, Marshal
French Literature, Foch, Marshal
1918 establishments in England
Language education in the United Kingdom
Lists of people associated with the University of Oxford
All Souls College, Oxford
French literature